Nozimakhon Kayumova (born 17 August 1992) is a visually impaired Uzbekistani Paralympic athlete and she competes in F13-classification javelin throw events. She won the gold medal in the women's javelin throw F13 event at both the 2016 Summer Paralympics in Rio de Janeiro, Brazil and the 2020 Summer Paralympics in Tokyo, Japan.

Career 

She represented Uzbekistan at the 2016 Summer Paralympics in Rio de Janeiro, Brazil and she won the gold medal in the women's javelin throw F13 event with throw of 44.58m.

At the 2017 World Para Athletics Championships held in London, United Kingdom, she won the silver medal in the women's javelin throw F13 event.

She qualified to represent Uzbekistan at the 2020 Summer Paralympics in Tokyo, Japan after winning the bronze medal in the women's javelin throw F13 event at the 2019 World Para Athletics Championships in Dubai, United Arab Emirates.

Achievements

References

External links 

 

Living people
1992 births
Place of birth missing (living people)
Uzbekistani female javelin throwers
Paralympic athletes with a vision impairment
Paralympic athletes of Uzbekistan
Athletes (track and field) at the 2016 Summer Paralympics
Athletes (track and field) at the 2020 Summer Paralympics
Medalists at the 2016 Summer Paralympics
Medalists at the 2020 Summer Paralympics
Paralympic gold medalists for Uzbekistan
Paralympic medalists in athletics (track and field)
21st-century Uzbekistani women
Uzbekistani blind people